Bhouri is a 2016 Indian social drama film. It is a glimpse of the life conditions of women in rural North India, set against the background of social conflict surrounding women in rural India. It was released on 17 June 2016. Masha Paur, Raghubir Yadav, Kunika, Shakti Kapoor, Aditya Pancholi played pivotal roles in the film.

Plot 
A tragic love story of Bhouri, a 23-year-old who is married to a 45-year-old, the film highlights the exploitation of women in male dominated society.

Cast 
 Masha Paur as Bhouri
 Raghubir Yadav as Dhanua
 Kunika as Kaki
 Aditya Pancholi as Inspector
 Shakti Kapoor as Doctor
 Mukesh Tiwari as Manager
 Mohan Joshi as Chaudhary
 Aarun Nagar as Sirsa
 Manoj Joshi as Banya
 Sitaram Panchal as Pandit
 Vikrant Rai as Shekhar / Filmmaker
 Vicky Ahuja as Budhua
 Pooja Saxena as Malti
 Manjeet Mahipal as Doctors Compounder
 Wasim Khan as Banya Assistant
 Padam Singh as Vakil
 Kiron Roy as Bindia
 Rani Verma as Basanti
 Riya Mishra as Chaudhrain
 Preeti Singh as Chuniya
 Shailendra Tiwari as Chief Medical Officer

References

External links 

2016 films
Indian satirical films
2010s Hindi-language films
Religious satire films